Sagesse (French, 'Wisdom') is an 1881 volume of French poetry by Paul Verlaine. 

Sagesse or La Sagesse may also refer to:

Education
Collège de la Sagesse, originally l'École de la Sagesse, a Lebanese school, and the Sagesse school network
Sagesse High School, in Ain Saadeh, Matn District, Lebanon
La Sagesse School, in Jesmond, Newcastle upon Tyne, England, 1906–2008
Université La Sagesse, in Lebanon

People
Sagesse Babélé (born 1993), Congolese footballer
Renaldo Sagesse (born 1986), Canadian football defensive lineman

Sports
La Sagesse (horse), a racehorse
Sagesse SC, a Lebanese multi-sport club 
Sagesse SC (basketball)
Sagesse SC (football)

See also

Wisdom (disambiguation)
Hikma (disambiguation)